Classic Masters is a compilation album from Grand Funk Railroad. Released in 2002, it is one in a series by Capitol Records.

It was intended to replace 1991's Capitol Collectors Series compilation, although track-wise they are identical except for one song. Both albums have 15 tracks, but Classic Masters includes "Take Me" whereas Collectors Series has "Inside Looking Out". The only other difference is the order of the tracks on the disc.

Classic Masters is 24-bit remastered whereas Collectors Series is credited as being mastered from the original stereo mixes. Classic Masters should be considered the better of the two CDs sound wise, but the Collectors Series does have better liner notes.

This CD as a sampler to the recently reissued/remastered Grand Funk catalogue on Capitol.

Track listing
All songs written and composed by Mark Farner except where noted.
 "We're An American Band" (We're An American Band) (Don Brewer) – 3:26
 "Time Machine" (On Time) – 3:45
 "Walk Like a Man" (We're An American Band) (Brewer/Farner) – 4:05
 "Some Kind of Wonderful" (All The Girls of The World Beware!!!) (John Ellison) – 3:22
 "Gimme Shelter" (Survival) (Mick Jagger, Keith Richards) – 6:18
 "Shinin' On" (Shinin' On) (Brewer/Farner) – 5:56
 "Heartbreaker" (On Time) – 6:34
 "Rock & Roll Soul" (Phoenix) – 3:29
 "The Loco-Motion" (Shinin' On) (Gerry Goffin/Carole King) – 	2:46
 "Footstompin' Music" (E Pluribus Funk) – 3:46
 "Mean Mistreater" (Live Album) – 4:55
 "Feelin' Alright" (Survival) (Dave Mason) – 4:26
 "Take Me" (Born To Die) (Brewer/Craig Frost) – 5:06
 "Bad Time" (All The Girls of The World Beware!!!) – 2:56
 "I'm Your Captain/Closer to Home" (Closer To Home) – 9:59

Personnel 
Grand Funk – producer
Jimmy Ienner – producer
Terry Knight – producer
Todd Rundgren – producer

Cheryl Pawelski – compilation producer
David K. Tedds – compilation producer
Robert Vosgien – remastering

References

2002 greatest hits albums
Grand Funk Railroad compilation albums
Albums produced by Terry Knight
Capitol Records compilation albums